Cedar Grove OnStage is an Asian Pacific American theatre arts organization established in 2006, based in Los Angeles, co-founded by playwright Tim Toyama and actor/director Chris Tashima who serves as Artistic Director. It is a division of the entertainment company, Cedar Grove Productions and their focus is to develop, produce and present new and original Asian American theatre works.

Background

Media company

In 1996, the independent media company Cedar Grove Productions was formed to produce the short film, Visas and Virtue (1997). The story focused on Holocaust rescuer Chiune “Sempo” Sugihara and the film won the Academy Award for Live Action Short Film at the 70th Academy Awards. The company takes its name from the literal translation of "Sugihara": sugi meaning cedar, and hara meaning field or grove.

Theatre
Cedar Grove OnStage formed in 2006 when Cedar Grove Productions was invited to join the "Cultural Roundtable" at THE NEW LATC, a multicultural theatre arts consortium led by the Latino Theatre Company operating out of the Los Angeles Theatre Center facilities in downtown Los Angeles. The Latino Theatre Company formed the Cultural Roundtable to create culturally diverse programming for the City of Los Angeles. Performance groups belonging to the Cultural Roundtable include Cedar Grove OnStage, Culture Clash, Latino Theater Company, Playwrights' Arena, Robey Theatre Company, and American Indian Dance Theatre/Project HOOP.

Production history

Mainstage production
 In September 2008, Cedar Grove OnStage worked in association with East West Players to produce the world premiere of Dan Kwong's Be Like Water, directed by Tashima, presented at the David Henry Hwang Theater at the Union Center for the Arts, in downtown Los Angeles' Little Tokyo.

Presentations
 April 2007 – 18 Mighty Mountain Warriors in Threat Condition: YELLOW at THE NEW LATC
 May 2008 – Cold Tofu in Edamame Nights at THE NEW LATC
 November 2008 – Dan Kwong in Its Great 2B American at THE NEW LATC

References

External links
 Cedar Grove OnStage on MySpace
 The LATC website

Asian-American theatre
Theatre companies in Los Angeles
Asian-American organizations
Entertainment companies based in California
Companies based in Los Angeles
Organizations based in Los Angeles
Entertainment companies established in 2006
Organizations established in 2006
2006 establishments in California